The Suzuki LT-R450 Quadracer was an all-terrain vehicle produced by Suzuki between 2006 and 2012. Intended as a race-ready ATV, the LT-R450 was developed with the help of WPSA ATV champion Doug Gust, and featured a fuel-injected  4-stroke DOHC single cylinder engine, based on the powerplant found in the RM-Z450 racer. In 2009, Suzuki stopped importing the LT-R450 into the United States, after 25,396 units had been sold. As a result of emissions control breaches on both the LT-R450 and the RMX450Z, the EPA fined Suzuki 885,000.

See also 
Motocross
All-terrain vehicle

References

Suzuki ATVs